A proliferation-inducing ligand (APRIL), also known as tumor necrosis factor ligand superfamily member 13 (TNFSF13), is a protein of the TNF superfamily recognized by the cell surface receptor TACI.

Nomenclature

In the cluster of differentiation terminology, APRIL is designated CD256.

Function 

The protein encoded by this gene is a member of the tumor necrosis factor ligand (TNF) ligand family. This protein is a ligand for TNFRSF17/BCMA, a member of the TNF receptor family. This protein and its receptor are both found to be important for B cell development. In vivo experiments suggest an important role for APRIL in the long-term survival of plasma cells in the bone marrow. Mice deficient in APRIL have normal immune system development. However, APRIL-deficient mice have also been reported to possess a reduced ability to support plasma cell survival. In vitro experiments suggested that this protein may be able to induce apoptosis through its interaction with other TNF receptor family proteins such as TNFRSF6/FAS and TNFRSF14/HVEM. Three alternatively spliced transcript variants of this gene encoding distinct isoforms have been reported.

Interactions 

TNFSF13 has been shown to interact with TNFRSF13B and B-cell activating factor.

Clinical significance 
APRIL is being explored as a target for autoimmune diseases and B cell malignancies. At least one anti-APRIL monoclonal antibody has been announced to enter phase I clinical trials for multiple myeloma.

References

Further reading

External links 
 
 

Clusters of differentiation